The Kish tablet is inscribed with Proto-Cuneiform signs, that have not been fully deciphered. It has been dated to the Uruk period (ca. 3500–3200 BC). It is sometimes incorrectly considered the world's oldest known written document, but this tablet is unprovenanced and was not excavated with scientific methodology, so its deposition date is uncertain. Hayes argues, according to the use of cases, it likely dates to later than the Uruk IV period. Several thousand proto-cuneiform documents dating to Uruk IV and III periods (ca. 3350–3000 BC) have been excavated at Uruk.

The Kish tablet is a limestone tablet possibly found at the site of the ancient Sumerian city of Kish in modern-day Tell al-Uhaymir, Babil Governorate, Iraq.   A plaster-cast of the artifact is today in the collection of the Ashmolean Museum. The original is in the Baghdad Museum. It should not be confused with the Scheil dynastic tablet, which contains part of the Sumerian king list and is also sometimes called the Kish tablet.

The writing is still purely pictographic, and represents a transitional stage between proto-writing and the emergence of the partly syllabic writing of the cuneiform script proper. The "proto-literate period" of Egypt and Mesopotamia is taken to span about 3500 to 2900 BC. The administrative texts of the Jemdet Nasr period (3100–2900 BC), found among other places at Jemdet Nasr and Tell Uqair represent a further stage in the development from Proto-Cuneiform to cuneiform, but can still not be identified with certainty as being written in Sumerian, although it is likely.

See also
Uruk period
History of writing
Narmer Palette
Warka Vase
Tărtăria tablets
List of oldest documents

References

Further reading
A. C. Moorhouse, The Triumph of the Alphabet: A History of Writing
Langdon, Pictographic Inscriptions from Jemdet Nasr 
Peter N. Stearns, The Encyclopedia of World History (2001), .

4th-millennium BC works
Cuneiform
Bronze Age writing systems
Archaeological artifacts
History of writing
Collection of the Ashmolean Museum
Uruk period
Limestone sculptures
Iraq–United Kingdom relations